The Birth of Baháʼu'lláh is one of nine holy days in the Baháʼí calendar that is celebrated by adherents of the Baháʼí Faith and during which work is suspended. The holy day celebrates the birth of Baháʼu'lláh, the founder of the Baháʼí Faith. The 2023 date is October 17.

Bahá'u'lláh was born on 12 November 1817 in Tehran, Iran, and this holy day was instituted in the Kitáb-i-Aqdas, his book of laws, where Baháʼu'lláh first refers to four great festivals: the Festival of Ridván, the Declaration of the Báb, the birth of the Báb—who is considered to be a Manifestation of God, and who foretold the coming of Baháʼu'lláh—and the birth of Baháʼu'lláh.  In questions submitted to Baháʼu'lláh after writing the Kitáb-i-Aqdas, Baháʼu'lláh states that the two days commemorating the births of the Báb and Baháʼu'lláh are seen to be one in the "sight of God" and are referred to as the "Twin Birthdays".

ʻAbdu'l-Bahá, the son of Baháʼu'lláh, stated that during the holy day the community should rejoice together to increase the unity of the community.  Baháʼís usually observe the holy day with community gatherings where prayers are shared and the birth of Baháʼu'lláh is celebrated. Baháʼu'lláh stated that in communities where the majority of the population are Shiʻa Muslims, such as Iran, his followers should exercise caution in celebrating the twin birthdays so that they do not upset the majority of the population who are mourning during the Islamic month of Muharram.

In the Islamic calendar, which is a lunar calendar, the two holy days fall on consecutive days: the birth of the Báb is on the first day of Muharram in 1235 AH (20 October 1819), and the birth of Baháʼu'lláh is on the second day of Muharram in 1233 AH (12 November 1817). Baháʼu'lláh stated that if the holy days occur during the Baháʼí month of fasting, Baháʼís need not observe the fast those days.

Since the Baháʼí calendar is a solar calendar, the decision to celebrate the Twin Holy Birthdays in a solar or lunar basis remains to the Universal House of Justice. Until March 20, 2015, in most of the world, the holy day was celebrated according to the solar year on 12 November, and the birth of the Báb was celebrated on 20 October. Since days in the Baháʼí calendar start at sunset, the holy day started on the evening of 11 November and proceeded until sunset on 12 November.

However, in 2014, the Universal House of Justice decided to celebrate the twin holy days on the first and second day following the eighth new moon after Naw-Rúz, starting from March 20, 2015 onwards. Thus from March 20, 2015 onward the day where the Birth of Baháʼu'lláh is celebrated will change from year to year.

References

Further reading 
 Baháʼí World Centre (2017). Days of Remembrance – Selections from the Writings of Baháʼu'lláh for Baháʼí Holy Days.
 Related documents on Baháʼí Library Online

External links 
 The Life of Baha'u'llah – A Photographic Narrative
 Official website of the Bicentenary of the Birth of Baháʼu'lláh
 The birth of Baháʼu'lláh: a bicentenary celebration of the Baháʼí Faith's founder . Exposition on Baháʼu'lláh's writings at the British Museum, London (2017-2018). 

Baháʼu'lláh
Birthdays
November observances
Bahá'í holy days